Epp Mäe (born 2 April 1992) is an Estonian freestyle wrestler. She won the silver medal in the women's 76 kg event at the 2021 World Wrestling Championships held in Oslo, Norway. She won a bronze medal at the 2015, 2019 and 2022 World Wrestling Championships.

Career 

She competed at the 2016 Summer Olympics where she finished in 13th place in the Women's 76 kg class.

She represented Estonia at the 2020 Summer Olympics in the Women's 76 kg class. In 2021, she won one of the bronze medals in the 76 kg event at the Grand Prix de France Henri Deglane 2021 held in Nice, France. She also won the silver medal in her event at the 2021 Poland Open held in Warsaw, Poland.

She won the silver medal in the women's 76 kg event at the 2022 European Wrestling Championships held in Budapest, Hungary. A few months later, she competed at the Matteo Pellicone Ranking Series 2022 held in Rome, Italy. She won one of the bronze medals in the women's 76kg event at the 2022 World Wrestling Championships held in Belgrade, Serbia.

Mäe took up wrestling in 1998, trained by her father. She has also competed in sumo and in judo.

Achievements

References

External links

 

1992 births
Living people
Estonian female judoka
Estonian sumo wrestlers
Estonian female sport wrestlers
Sportspeople from Rakvere
World Wrestling Championships medalists
Female sumo wrestlers
Wrestlers at the 2016 Summer Olympics
Olympic wrestlers of Estonia
World Games gold medalists
Competitors at the 2009 World Games
Wrestlers at the 2015 European Games
Wrestlers at the 2019 European Games
European Games bronze medalists for Estonia
European Games medalists in wrestling
European Wrestling Championships medalists
Wrestlers at the 2020 Summer Olympics
European Wrestling Champions
21st-century Estonian women